A list of notable theologians from Slovenia:

A 
 Aloysius Ambrozic

B 
 Franc Breckerfeld

C 
 Andrew of Carniola

G 
 Christian Gostečnik
 Gabriel Gruber
 Vekoslav Grmič

K 
 Edvard Kovač
 Sebastijan Krelj

M 
 Anton Mahnič

R 
 Franc Rode

S 
 Josip Srebrnič
 Anton Stres
 Anton Strle
 Avguštin Stegenšek

Š 
 Alojzij Šuštar

T 
 Vladimir Truhlar

U 
 Aleš Ušeničnik

 
Theologian
Theologian
Lists of theologians and religious studies scholars